A property qualification is a clause or rule by which those without property (land), or those without property of a set appraised value, or those without income of a set value, are not enfranchised to vote in elections, to stand for election, to hold office or from other activities.

History 
A property qualification originally barred most commoners from voting or standing for election to the House of Commons of England and Wales (after 1707, of the Kingdom of Great Britain and, after 1801, of the United Kingdom of Great Britain and Ireland). The Great Reform Bill of 1832 widened the franchise (immediately before this, only a few thousand men could vote), although it would be 1918 before all men could vote (although women would wait until 1928; British nationals from the British Overseas Territories technically have the right to vote or stand for election but cannot do so unless they move residence to the United Kingdom, as no House of Commons electoral district has been created for any British Overseas Territory).

The 18th-century Militia of England and Wales did not sell commissions in the way that the British Army did at the time, but it instead restricted them to property owners and those with income of a set minimum value. 

In jurisdictions where the political and economic spheres are dominated by one ethnic, religious or racial group, property qualifications have been used as a way to exclude members of other ethnic, religious or racial groups that may disproportionately lack the required resources. This was the case in Northern Ireland, where a property requirement was used to exclude indigenous Irish Catholics from voting in elections for seats in the Stormont Parliament until 1969. Prior to the 1921 Partition of Ireland, the Protestant Ascendancy had similarly barred most of the native Irish Catholics from voting for Irish seats in the Parliament of the United Kingdom of Great Britain and Ireland once the last bar to Catholics voting in the United Kingdom had been lifted by the Roman Catholic Relief Act 1829. The property qualification remained in place for United Kingdom elections until the passage of the Representation of the People Act 1918.

In the 18th-century Thirteen Colonies, suffrage was restricted to males with the following property qualifications:

Connecticut: an estate worth 40 shillings annually or £40 of personal property
Delaware: fifty acres of land (twelve under cultivation) or £40 of personal property
Georgia: fifty acres of land
Maryland: fifty acres of land and £40 personal property
Massachusetts Bay: an estate worth 40 shillings annually or £40 of personal property
New Hampshire: £50 of personal property
New Jersey: one-hundred acres of land, or real estate or personal property £50
New York: £40 of personal property or ownership of land
North Carolina: fifty acres of land
Pennsylvania: fifty acres of land or £50 of personal property
Rhode Island and Providence Plantations: personal property worth £40 or yielding 50 shillings annually
South Carolina: one-hundred acres of land on which taxes were paid; or a town house or lot worth £60 on which taxes were paid; or payment of 10 shillings in taxes
Virginia: fifty acres of vacant land, twenty-fives acres of cultivated land, and a house twelve feet by twelve feet; or a town lot and a house twelve feet by twelve

References

Suffrage
Equality rights
Social inequality